Sofia Pernas (born July 31, 1989) is an American actress of Moroccan-Spanish descent who currently resides in Los Angeles. She starred in the NBC series The Brave and currently stars in the Paramount+ action adventure series Blood & Treasure.

Early life
Pernas moved to the United States when she was five years old and grew up in Orange County, California. Her mother is from Morocco, while her father is from Galicia Spain; both are multilingual. As a result, she speaks four languages: Arabic, English, Spanish, German and a bit of Galician-Portuguese. Although she initially planned a career in journalism, she was redirected to a career in modeling and acting after being scouted.

Career
Pernas played Marisa Sierras on The Young and the Restless from 2015 to 2017, and appeared on the telenovela Jane the Virgin from 2016 to 2017. She starred as Hannah Rivera in the NBC series The Brave from 2017 to 2018, and since 2019 has played Lexi Vaziri on the CBS series Blood & Treasure.

Personal life 
Pernas began dating her former The Young and the Restless co-star Justin Hartley in May 2020. They married in March 2021.

Filmography

References

External links
 

1989 births
Living people
American people of Moroccan descent
Moroccan actresses
Spanish actresses
Spanish people of Moroccan descent
Actresses from Orange County, California
American people of Spanish descent
21st-century American women